Hibbertia glomerosa is a species of flowering plant in the family Dilleniaceae and is endemic to the south-west of Western Australia. It is a shrub with linear to narrow oblong leaves and bright yellow flowers borne on the ends of short side shoots, with twenty-five to thirty-eight stamens arranged in groups of five around the five glabrous carpels.

Description
There are 25 to 38 stamens arranged in five groups of four to eight, arranged around the five spherical, glabrous carpels, each carpel containing one ovule.

Taxonomy
This species was first formally described in 1863 by George Bentham who gave it the name Candolleana glomerosa in Flora Australiensis from specimens collected by Augustus Oldfield from Port Gregory. In 1882, Ferdinand von Mueller changed the name to Hibbertia glomerosa in the Systematic Census of Australian Plants. The specific epithet (glomerosa) means "abounding in balls of yarn", referring to the groups of flowers.

Distribution and habitat
Hibbertia glomerosa grows in shrubland, heath and mallee and is widespread inland areas of south-western Western Australia.

Conservation status
Hibbertia glomerosa is classified as "not threatened" by the Government of Western Australia Department of Parks and Wildlife.

See also
List of Hibbertia species

References

glomerosa
Flora of Western Australia
Plants described in 1863
Taxa named by George Bentham